Alparslan Erdem (born 11 December 1988) is a Turkish professional footballer who plays as a left back.

Career
Erdem played previously for Galatasaray and Werder Bremen II.

On 18 January 2010, Alparslan Erdem signed a two-and-a-half-year contract with Turkish club Gençlerbirliği.

Honours
Galatasaray
 Turkish Super Cup: 2008

References

External links
 
 
  Erdem to Gençlerbirliği

1988 births
Living people
People from Vechta
German people of Turkish descent
German footballers
Turkish footballers
Footballers from Lower Saxony
Association football defenders
Turkey B international footballers
Turkey under-21 international footballers
SV Werder Bremen II players
Galatasaray S.K. footballers
Gençlerbirliği S.K. footballers
Bucaspor footballers
İstanbul Başakşehir F.K. players
Fatih Karagümrük S.K. footballers
3. Liga players
Süper Lig players
TFF First League players